The Juzan was a French automobile manufactured only in 1897; it was a light motorised quadricycle along De Dion lines.

References
David Burgess Wise, The New Illustrated Encyclopedia of Automobiles

1890s cars
Defunct motor vehicle manufacturers of France
Cars introduced in 1897